Beatriz Haddad Maia was the defending champion, but chose to compete at the 2018 Mutua Madrid Open instead.

Rebecca Peterson won the title, defeating Dayana Yastremska in the final, 6–4, 7–5.

Seeds

Draw

Finals

Top half

Bottom half

References
Main Draw

Open de Cagnes-sur-Mer - Singles